A vine (Latin vīnea "grapevine", "vineyard", from vīnum "wine") is any plant with a growth habit of trailing or scandent (that is, climbing) stems, lianas or runners. The word vine can also refer to such stems or runners themselves, for instance, when used in wicker work.

In parts of the world, including the British Isles, the term "vine" usually applies exclusively to grapevines (Vitis), while the term "climber" is used for all climbing plants.

Growth forms 

Certain plants always grow as vines, while a few grow as vines only part of the time. For instance, poison ivy and bittersweet can grow as low shrubs when support is not available, but will become vines when support is available.

A vine displays a growth form based on very long stems. This has two purposes. A vine may use rock exposures, other plants, or other supports for growth rather than investing energy in a lot of supportive tissue, enabling the plant to reach sunlight with a minimum investment of energy. This has been a highly successful growth form for plants such as kudzu and Japanese honeysuckle, both of which are invasive exotics in parts of North America. There are some tropical vines that develop skototropism, and grow away from the light, a type of negative phototropism. Growth away from light allows the vine to reach a tree trunk, which it can then climb to brighter regions.

The vine growth form may also enable plants to colonize large areas quickly, even without climbing high. This is the case with periwinkle and ground ivy. It is also an adaptation to life in areas where small patches of fertile soil are adjacent to exposed areas with more sunlight but little or no soil. A vine can root in the soil but have most of its leaves in the brighter, exposed area, getting the best of both environments.

The evolution of a climbing habit has been implicated as a key innovation associated with the evolutionary success and diversification of a number of taxonomic groups of plants. It has evolved independently in several plant families, using many different climbing methods, such as:
 twining the stem around a support (e.g., morning glories, Ipomoea species)
 by way of adventitious, clinging roots (e.g., ivy, Hedera species)
 with twining petioles (e.g., Clematis species)
 using tendrils, which can be specialized shoots (Vitaceae), leaves (Bignoniaceae), or even inflorescences (Passiflora)
 using tendrils which also produce adhesive pads at the end that attach themselves quite strongly to the support (Parthenocissus)
 using thorns (e.g. climbing rose) or other hooked structures, such as hooked branches (e.g. Artabotrys hexapetalus)

The climbing fetterbush (Pieris phillyreifolia) is a woody shrub-vine which climbs without clinging roots, tendrils, or thorns. It directs its stem into a crevice in the bark of fibrous barked trees (such as bald cypress) where the stem adopts a flattened profile and grows up the tree underneath the host tree's outer bark. The fetterbush then sends out branches that emerge near the top of the tree.

Most vines are flowering plants. These may be divided into woody vines or lianas, such as akebia wisteria, kiwifruit, and common ivy, and herbaceous (nonwoody) vines, such as morning glory.

One odd group of vining plants is the fern genus Lygodium, called climbing ferns. The stem does not climb, but rather the fronds (leaves) do. The fronds unroll from the tip, and theoretically never stop growing; they can form thickets as they unroll over other plants, rockfaces, and fences.

Twining vines

A twining vine, also known as a bine, is one that climbs by its shoots growing in a helix, in contrast to vines that climb using tendrils or suckers. Many bines have rough stems or downward-pointing bristles to aid their grip. Hops (used in flavoring beer) are a commercially important example of a bine.

The direction of rotation of the shoot tip during climbing is autonomous and does not (as sometimes imagined) derive from the shoot's following the sun around the sky – the direction of twist does not therefore depend upon which side of the equator the plant is growing on. This is shown by the fact that some bines always twine clockwise, including runner bean (Phaseolus coccineus) and bindweed (Convolvulus species), while others twine anticlockwise, including French bean (Phaseolus vulgaris) and climbing honeysuckles (Lonicera species). The contrasting rotations of bindweed and honeysuckle was the theme of the satirical song "Misalliance", written and sung by Michael Flanders and Donald Swann.

Horticultural climbing plants 
The term "vine" also applies to cucurbitaceae like cucumbers where botanists refer to creeping vines; in commercial agriculture the natural tendency of coiling tendrils to attach themselves to pre-existing structures or espaliers is optimized by the installation of trellis netting.

Gardeners can use the tendency of climbing plants to grow quickly. If a plant display is wanted quickly, a climber can achieve this. Climbers can be trained over walls, pergolas, fences, etc. Climbers can be grown over other plants to provide additional attraction. Artificial support can also be provided. Some climbers climb by themselves; others need work, such as tying them in and training them.

Scientific description

Vines widely differ in size, form and evolutionary origin. Darwin classified climbing groups based on their climbing method. He classified five classes of vines – twining plants, leaf climbers, tendril bearers, root climbers and hook climbers.

Vines are unique in that they have multiple evolutionary origins. They usually reside in tropical locations and have the unique ability to climb. Vines are able to grow in both deep shade and full sun due to their uniquely wide range of phenotypic plasticity. This climbing action prevents shading by neighbors and allows the vine to grow out of reach of herbivores. The environment where a vine can grow successfully is determined by the climbing mechanism of a vine and how far it can spread across supports. There are many theories supporting the idea that photosynthetic responses are closely related to climbing mechanisms.

Temperate twining vines, which twist tightly around supports, are typically poorly adapted for climbing beneath closed canopies due to their smaller support diameter and shade intolerance. In contrast, tendril vines usually grow on the forest floor and onto trees until they reach the surface of the canopy, suggesting that they have greater physiological plasticity. It has also been suggested that twining vines' revolving growth is mediated by changes in turgor pressure mediated by volume changes in the epidermal cells of the bending zone.

Climbing vines can take on many unique characteristics in response to changes in their environments. Climbing vines can induce chemical defenses and modify their biomass allocation in response to herbivores. In particular, the twisting vine Convolvulus arvensis increases its twining in response to herbivore-associated leaf damage, which may lead to reduced future herbivory. Additionally, the tendrils of perennial vine Cayratia japonica are more likely to coil around nearby plants of another species than nearby plants of the same species in natural and experimental settings. This ability, which has only been previously documented in roots, demonstrates the vine's ability to distinguish whether another plant is of the same species as itself or a different one.

In tendrilled vines, the tendrils are highly sensitive to touch and the coiling action is mediated by the hormones octadecanoids, jasmonates and indole-3-acetic acid. The touch stimulus and hormones may interact via volatile compounds or internal oscillation patterns. Research has found the presence of ion translocating ATPases in the Bryonia dioica species of plants, which has implications for a possible ion mediation tendril curling mechanism. In response to a touch stimulus, vanadate sensitive K+, Mg2+ ATPase and a Ca2+ translocating ATPase rapidly increase their activity. This increases transmembrane ion fluxes that appear to be involved in the early stages of tendril coiling.

Example vine taxa

 Actinidia arguta, the tara vine
 Actinidia polygama, the silver vine
 Adlumia fungosa, the Allegheny vine
 Aeschynanthus radicans, the lipstick vine
 Akebia quinata, five leafed chocolate vine
 Akebia trifoliata, three leafed chocolate vine
 Allamanda cathartica, common trumpetvine
 Ampelocissus acetosa, known as wild grape or djabaru
 Ampelopsis glandulosa var. brevipedunculata, known as wild grape or porcelain berry
 Anredera cordifolia, Madeira-vine
 Antigonon, the coral vine
 Antigonon leptopus, the Confederate vine
 Aptenia cordifolia, the heart-leaved aptenia 
 Araujia sericifera, moth vine
 Asparagus asparagoides, bridal creeper, bridal-veil creeper
 Banisteriopsis caapi, ayahuasca, also known as caapi, yage, and soul vine 
 Berchemia scandens, the rattan vine
 Bignonia, the cross vine
 Bougainvillea, a genus of thorny ornamental vines, bushes, and trees
 Callerya megasperma, native wisteria
 Calystegia sepium, hedge bindweed
 Campsis, the trumpet vine
 Campsis grandiflora, the Chinese trumpet vine
 Cardiospermum halicacabum, the balloon vine
 Celastrus, the staff vine
 Ceropegia woodii, string of hearts
 Clematis vitalba, traveller's joy
 Clerodendrum thomsoniae, bleeding-heart vine
 Clitoria ternatea, butterfly pea
 Ceropegia linearis, the rosary vine or sweetheart vine
 Cissus antarctica, the kangaroo vine
 Cissus hypoglauca, the water vine
 Citrullus lanatus var. lanatus, the watermelon
 Cobaea scandens, cup-and-saucer vine, cathedral bells, Mexican ivy
 Cochliasanthus, known as corkscrew vine, snail vine, snail creeper
 Cucumis sativus, the cucumber
 Cyphostemma juttae, known as wild grape
 Delairea, German ivy
 Dolichandra unguis-cati, cat's claw creeper, funnel creeper, or cat's claw trumpet
 Epipremnum aureum, known as golden pothos and devil's ivy
 Fallopia baldschuanica, the Russian vine
 Ficus pumila, known as the climbing fig
 Hardenbergia violacea, lilac vine
 Hedera helix, known as common ivy, English ivy, European ivy, or ivy
 Hibbertia scandens, climbing guinea flower, golden guinea vine, gold guinea plant
 Hoya, a genus of about 300 species of climbing or creeping plants
 Humulus lupulus, common hop
 Hydrangea petiolaris, climbing hydrangea 
 Ipomoea cairica, known as Cairo morning glory, coast morning glory and railroad creeper
 Ipomoea indica, known as ocean blue morning glory
 Jasminum polyanthum, pink jasmine
 Kadsura japonica, kadsura vine
 Kennedia coccinea, the common coral vine
 Kennedia nigricans''', black coral pea
 Lagenaria siceraria, known as the bottle gourd, calabash, opo squash, or long melon
 Lathyrus odoratus, the sweet pea
 Lonicera japonica, known as Suikazura or Japanese honeysuckle
 Luffa, a genus of tropical and subtropical vines classified in the cucumber family, Cucurbitaceae
 Lygodium, a genus of about 40 species of ferns, known as climbing ferns

 Mandevilla, rocktrumpet, Brazilian jasmine
 Momordica charantia, the bitter gourd
 Mikania scandens, the hemp vine
 Muehlenbeckia adpressa, the macquarie vine
 Nepenthes, a genus of carnivorous plants known as tropical pitcher plants or monkey cups
 Pandorea jasminoides, bower vine
 Pandorea pandorana, the wonga wonga vine
 Parthenocissus henryana, Chinese Virginia-creeper, silver vein creeper
 Parthenocissus quinquefolia, known as the Virginia creeper, Victoria creeper, five-leaved ivy, or five-finger
 Parthenocissus tricuspidata, Boston ivy, Japanese ivy
 Passiflora edulis, the passion fruit
 Periploca graeca, the silk vine
 Philodendron hederaceum, heartleaf philodendron
 Podranea ricasoliana, the pink trumpet vine
 Pueraria lobata, the kudzu vine
 Pyrostegia venusta, flamevine or orange trumpet vine
 Pseudogynoxys chenopodioides, Mexican flamevine 
 Rosa banksiae, Lady Banks' rose
 Rosa filipes, climbing rose
 Schizophragma, hydrangea vine
 Scindapsus pictus, the silver vine
 Sechium edule, known as chayote, christophene, or several other names
 Senecio angulatus, known as Cape ivy
 Solandra, a genus of flowering plants in the nightshade family
 Solanum laxum, the potato vine
 Stephania japonica, snake vine
 Stephanotis floribunda, known as Madagascar jasmine
 Strongylodon macrobotrys, the jade vine
 Syngonium, the goosefoot vine
 Syngonium podophyllum, the arrowhead vine

 Thunbergia alata, black-eyed Susan
 Thunbergia grandiflora, known as the Bengal clock vine or blue trumpet vine
 Thunbergia erecta, the bush clock vine
 Toxicodendron radicans, known as poison ivy
 Trachelospermum asiaticum, Asiatic jasmine
 Trachelospermum jasminoides, Confederate jasmine, star jasmine
 Vitis, any of about sixty species of grape
 Wisteria, a genus of flowering plants in the pea family
 Xerosicyos'', silver dollar vine

See also
Vine (disambiguation)
Liana, any of various long-stemmed, woody vines
Nutation (botany), bending and growth patterns of plants, which dictate the growth of vines.
On the Movements and Habits of Climbing Plants, by Charles Darwin
List of world's longest vines
Vine training systems
Pergola
Trellis (architecture)

References

External links

 
 
 

Plant morphology
 
Plants by habit
Plant life-forms